William M. Inge (February 22, 1832 - November 26, 1900) was an American Democratic politician. He was the Speaker of the Mississippi House of Representatives from 1884 to 1886.

Biography 
William M. Inge was born on February 22, 1832, in Greene County, Alabama. When he was a boy, he moved with his family to Aberdeen, Mississippi.

During the American Civil War, Inge served in the Confederate States Army. Originally being adjutant of the 12th Mississippi Infantry Regiment and then a staff officer, serving in the Eastern Theater, later he became a partisan and cavalry commander in the Western Theater. There he led the 12th Mississippi Partisan Rangers and eventually was made Colonel of the 12th (10th) Mississippi Cavalry Regiment.

In 1881, Inge was elected to represent Alcorn County as a Democrat in the Mississippi House of Representatives for the 1882-1884 term. He was re-elected in 1883 for the 1884-1886 term. During this term, Inge was elected to the position of the House's Speaker. Inge died at his home in Corinth, Mississippi, on November 26, 1900.

References 

1832 births
1900 deaths
People from Corinth, Mississippi
Speakers of the Mississippi House of Representatives
Democratic Party members of the Mississippi House of Representatives
Confederate States Army officers